The Platinum Collection is a compilation album released by English rock group Deep Purple. It features songs from their first album Shades of Deep Purple up to their (at the time) most recent album Bananas.

Track listing
All songs written by Ian Gillan, Ritchie Blackmore, Roger Glover, Jon Lord and Ian Paice, except where noted.

Disc one

Disc two

Disc three

Charts

Certifications

References

2005 greatest hits albums
Deep Purple compilation albums
EMI Records compilation albums